This is a history of the South Africa national rugby league team.

Attempted establishment
Rugby league would first gain attention in South Africa when the English and French would attempt expansion in the 1950s for the purpose of creating further international opposition. Three games would then be played between the two nations on the continent but both sides viewed the matches as nothing more than friendly fixtures so never undertook the games in a serious manner and the public never subsequently took to the three exhibition games.

Formation of national side
Over the next several years rugby league would lie dormant in South Africa and it was not until the 1960s when talks of creating a national side began. After much discussion within South Africa, it was eventually agreed that a national side would play a touring Great Britain and then undertake a tour of Australasia. The first South African national side played their first competitive fixture on 23 August 1962 and put on a good showing against the much stronger British but eventually lost by nineteen points, 49–30. The following two fixtures turned out to be much the same with the South Africans being defeated on another two occasions but putting in good performances whilst never being comprehensively beaten. The South Africans would embark on their first tour eleven months later with a twenty-four-man squad that included several former Springboks. The tour would start with several friendly fixtures against various minor representative sides where they would gain two comfortable victories, the first international fixture of the tour would take place in Brisbane against the world champion Australians and the South Africans would perform with courage but eventually lose the match 34–6. The following test was played a week later in Sydney that again saw the team put in a tough effort but would lose again 54–21. South Africa would leave Australia without an international win and be low on confidence heading to New Zealand to play a sole fixture against the New Zealand Kiwis whom were expected to win comfortably. However the match turned out to be a tough encounter and surprisingly saw the team gain its first international victory 4-3 The South African side was supplemented by several Australians for this match and so the fixture was not granted test match status.

After this first string of international fixtures the South Africans became disheartened after only winning four of the thirteen tour matches and rugby league again lay dormant for decades. Initiative taken to develop the game in South Africa, were continuously hit by well organised efforts to withhold playing fields from the league clubs. This was one of the most important reasons why the league game could not settle. Municipal officials and rugby union played a major role to cripple all efforts. The league players who could not carry on while their friends were overseas threw in the towel and that was the main reason for the league dry up. (Ex-player: "I know what happened" - Jan Prinsloo)

The Rugby League World Cup tournament had been scheduled to be held in France in 1965, this time with the inclusion of the South African team. However the tournament was abandoned.

First World Cup
The early 1990s would see new South African administrators begin to rebuild the international facet of South African rugby. During 1992 the South African national side would again play for the first time in years against several combined African representative teams and the following years would see things look more promising for the Africans with their qualification into the 1995 World Cup and more regularity in international fixtures. Their first World Cup would see the South Africans seeded into the toughest group of the competition containing Australia, England and Fiji. The South Africans would find their three group matches extremely difficult and would fail to win a match during the tournament.

Second World Cup
The following years saw the South Africans play on an inconsistent basis against several touring sides most notably including the touring French and Russian sides. Continued progress would see them again qualify for what would be their second consecutive World Cup in 2000 and leading into the tournament they were hopeful of gaining their first Cup win after being drawn into an easier yet still competitive group with France, Papua New Guinea and Tonga. Prior to the tournament they would play Wales for the first time in a tough friendly encounter. After initial optimism leading into the competition the South Africans would face Tonga in their first world cup fixture and be comprehensively beaten 66–18. The following world cup matches would add further disappointment and diminish all optimism the South Africans originally had leading into the competition with a following loss to Papua New Guinea 16-0 and a heavy loss to the French which saw captain Jamie Bloem sin-binned and investigated following comments made about the referee after the match.

2006 Italian tour
After a second disappointing World Cup the side would again begin playing irregularly with one off fixtures over the next several years usually against touring national sides but it would not be until 2006 when they would again undertake another tour to foreign soil. A tour to Italy would be undertaken in June 2006 that saw the South Africans play in two tests and gaining their largest victory to date along with appearing in a separate rugby league nines competition in Montelanico.

References

External links

Rugby league in South Africa
South Africa national rugby league team
National rugby league team